Astoria Township is one of twenty-six townships in Fulton County, Illinois, USA.  As of the 2010 census, its population was 1,464 and it contained 665 housing units.

Geography

Cities, towns, villages
 Astoria
 Washington (no longer exists due to another town in the state with the name). The village contained 48 lots. It was laid out in 1836 & it had a small general store, a few cabins, blacksmith shop and a school house nearby which was also used to hold church services. The village never grew & ceased to exist.
 Vienna was laid out by Zach Gilbert, Benjamin Clark & a Mr Bacon on June 9, 1837. Due to there being another town in the state with this name it was changed to Astoria.

Cemeteries
The township contains these five cemeteries: Astoria, Oak Grove, Salem, South Fulton and Union Chapel.

Major highways
  US Route 24

Airports and landing strips
 Campbell Landing Strip

Lakes
 Emmanuel Lake

Demographics

School districts
 Astoria Community Unit School District 1
 V I T Community Unit School District 2

Political districts
 Illinois' 17th congressional district
 State House District 94
 State Senate District 47

References
 
 United States Census Bureau 2007 TIGER/Line Shapefiles
 United States National Atlas

External links
 City-Data.com
 Illinois State Archives

Townships in Fulton County, Illinois
Townships in Illinois